The Venezuelan lowland rabbit (Sylvilagus varynaensis), also known as the Barinas wild rabbit, is a cottontail rabbit species found in western Venezuela.

Diet
Its diet consists in large measure of plants of the genus Sida.

Habitat
It is found in lowland savannas close to dry forests within the Llanos ecoregion.

Description
It is the largest of only three leporids known from South America. Head and body length is about 44 cm, with females being slightly larger.

Breeding
Reproduction takes place over three quarters of the year, with an average of 2.6 embryos per litter, but most commonly during September through December. The gestation period is 35 days.

Threats
Possible threats to the species include habitat destruction by deforestation and agricultural conversion, competition with grazing livestock and hunting.

References 

Sylvilagus
Mammals of Venezuela
Endemic fauna of Venezuela
Mammals described in 2001